Introductio in analysin infinitorum (Latin: Introduction to the Analysis of the Infinite) is a two-volume work by Leonhard Euler which lays the foundations of mathematical analysis. Written in Latin and published in 1748, the Introductio contains 18 chapters in the first part and 22 chapters in the second. It has Eneström numbers E101 and E102.

Carl Boyer's lectures at the 1950 International Congress of Mathematicians compared the influence of  Euler's Introductio to that of Euclid's Elements, calling the Elements the foremost textbook of ancient times, and the Introductio "the foremost textbook of modern times". Boyer also wrote:
The analysis of Euler comes close to the modern orthodox discipline, the study of functions by means of infinite processes, especially through infinite series.
It is doubtful that any other essentially didactic work includes as large a portion of original material that survives in the college courses today...Can be read with comparative ease by the modern student...The prototype of modern textbooks.

The first translation into English was that by John D. Blanton, published in 1988. The second, by Ian Bruce, is available online. A list of the editions of Introductio has been assembled by V. Frederick Rickey.

Chapter 1 is on the concepts of variables and functions. Chapter 4 introduces infinite series through rational functions.

According to Henk Bos,
The Introduction is meant as a survey of concepts and methods in analysis and analytic geometry preliminary to the study of the differential and integral calculus. [Euler] made of this survey a masterly exercise in introducing as much as possible of analysis without using differentiation or integration. In particular, he introduced the elementary transcendental functions, the logarithm, the exponential function, the trigonometric functions and their inverses without recourse to integral calculus — which was no mean feat, as the logarithm was traditionally linked to the quadrature of the hyperbola and the trigonometric functions to the arc-length of the circle.

Euler accomplished this feat by introducing exponentiation ax for arbitrary constant a in the positive real numbers. He noted that mapping x this way is not an algebraic function, but rather a transcendental function. For a > 1 these functions are monotonic increasing and form bijections of the real line with positive real numbers. Then each base a corresponds to an inverse function called the logarithm to base a, in chapter 6. In chapter 7, Euler introduces e as the number whose hyperbolic logarithm is 1. The reference here is to Gregoire de Saint-Vincent who performed a quadrature of the hyperbola y = 1/x through description of the hyperbolic logarithm. Section 122 labels the logarithm to base e the "natural or hyperbolic logarithm...since the quadrature of the hyperbola can be expressed through these logarithms".  Here he also gives the exponential series:
 

Then in chapter 8 Euler is prepared to address the classical trigonometric functions as "transcendental quantities that arise from the circle." He uses the unit circle and presents Euler's formula. Chapter 9 considers trinomial factors in polynomials. Chapter 16 is concerned with partitions, a topic in number theory. Continued fractions are the topic of chapter 18.

Early mentions

 J.C. Scriba (2007) review of 1983 reprint of 1885 German edition

Reviews of Blanton translation 1988
 Doru Stefanescu 
 Marco Panza (2007) 
 Ricardo Quintero Zazueta (1999) 
 Ernst Hairer & Gerhard Wanner (1996) Analysis by its History, chapter 1, pp 1 to 79, Undergraduate Texts in Mathematics #70,

References

1748 books
Mathematics textbooks
Mathematical analysis
Leonhard Euler
18th-century Latin books